Onella Jack (born 25 October 1991) is a Trinidadian netball player who plays for Trinidad and Tobago in the positions of goal attack, wing attack, wing defense or goal defense. She has featured for the national side in three World Cup tournaments in 2011, 2015 and in 2019. She has also represented Trinidad and Tobago at the 2014 Commonwealth Games.

References 

1991 births
Living people
Trinidad and Tobago netball players
Netball players at the 2014 Commonwealth Games
Commonwealth Games competitors for Trinidad and Tobago